Victory dance may refer to:

Victory dance (sports), an elaborate celebration of a score or a victory 
 Seungjeonmu (literally "victory dance"), a Korean court dance
 "The Victory Ball" (aka "A Victory Dance"), an anti-war poem by Alfred Noyes

In music
 The Victory Dance, an album by Irish singer-songwriter David Geraghty
 "The Victory Dance", a song from the album Theocracy by Christian metal band Theocracy
 "Victory Dance", a song from the album Circuital by American rock band My Morning Jacket 
 "Victory Dance", a song from the album Roadhouse by American rock band John Cafferty & The Beaver Brown Band
 "The Dance of Victory", a song from the album Sprit by Swiss band Eluveitie